Sakaria Lukas (born 4 May 1984) is a Namibian professional boxer. As an amateur, he competed at the 2010 Commonwealth Games.

Amateur career
A bantamweight, Lukas competed for Namibia at the 2010 Commonwealth Games in the Bantamweight division. In his first match, he beat Joe Ham of Scotland. Following the match, Ham lost consciousness and was treated for a concussion. In Lukas' second match, he was defeated by Botswana's Tirafalo Seoko on points, 11-13.

Lukas began his boxing career in 2006 when he won a gold medal at the Zone 6 Youth Games in Windhoek and a silver medal at the senior Zone 6 championships. He also suffered a knee injury which forced him to take time off from boxing but returned for the 2010 Zone 6 Championships in Johannesburg, where he won a gold medal.

Professional boxing record

References

External links
 

Living people
1984 births
Namibian male boxers
Bantamweight boxers
Featherweight boxers
Boxers at the 2010 Commonwealth Games
Commonwealth Games competitors for Namibia